A post road is a road designated for the transportation of postal mail. Post Road may also refer to:

 Post Road (magazine), a literary magazine published by Boston College
 Post Road Branch, a railroad line
 Post Road (play), a 1934 Broadway play by Wilbur Daniel Steele and Norma Mitchell